Robert Joseph Young  (born 29 May 1948) is a British materials scientist specialising in polymers and composites. He is a Professor of Polymer Science and Technology at the National Graphene Institute of the University of Manchester.

Education 
Young was educated at St John's College, Cambridge, where he received his Master of Arts and Doctor of Philosophy degrees.

Research and career
Young has published over 330 research papers which have been cited over 37,000 times, leading to a h-index of 91. He is known for research on the relationships between the structure and mechanical properties of polymers and composites. A particular focus of his work has been the study of how materials such as carbon fibres and spider silk deform at the molecular level. He has also studied carbon-fibre composites, carbon nanotubes and the deformation of graphene — a one-atom thick sheet of carbon. Among his work on polymer-graphene composites, one important result elucidated for the first time the relationship between composite reinforcement and matrix modulus.

In his research, Young made a novel use of Raman spectroscopy. In this technique, laser light is shone onto a material and the wavelength and intensity of the resulting scattered light is measured and analysed. The changes in the light relate to changes in bond length between the atoms of the molecules in the material when the material is deformed.

He has also co-authored the widely used textbook: Introduction to Polymers.

Awards and honours 
Young received the 2011 Leslie Holliday Prize and the 2012 Swinburne Medal from the Institute of Materials, Minerals and Mining, and delivered the Swinburne Lecture in 2013. He was elected a Fellow of the Royal Society (FRS) in 2013. His certificate of election reads:

References 

1948 births
Living people
British materials scientists
Fellows of the Royal Society
Fellows of the Royal Academy of Engineering
Fellows of the Institute of Physics
Alumni of St John's College, Cambridge
Academics of the University of Manchester
Fellows of the Institute of Materials, Minerals and Mining